Alert Standard Format (ASF) (also sometimes referred to as Alert Standard Forum, Alerting Specifications Forum, Alert Specification Function, etc.) is a DMTF standard for remote monitoring, management and control of computer systems in both OS-present and OS-absent environments. These technologies are primarily focused on minimizing on-site I/T maintenance, maximizing system availability and performance to the local user.

ASF, unlike other DMTF standards, defines both external-facing network protocols (for use with Remote Management Consoles and Alert Sending Devices) and system-internal protocols and data models (for use in System Firmware, Remote Control Devices, Alert Sending Devices, and Sensors).

ASF v1.0 (DSP0114) was published by the DMTF Pre-OS Working Group in June 2001.

ASF v2.0 (DSP0136), adding secure remote authentication and data integrity, was published by the DMTF Pre-OS Working Group in April 2003.

Network protocols 
 RMCP (Remote Management and Control Protocol) transmitted by the Remote Management Console and received by the Alert Sending Device via UDP port 623
 RSP (RMCP Security-Extensions Protocol) transmitted by the Remote Management Console and received by the Alert Sending Device via UDP port 664 (added in ASF 2.0)
 PET (Platform Event Traps) transmitted by the Alert Sending Device and received by the Remote Management Console via UDP port 162 (SNMP-Traps)

Internal protocols and data models 
 SMBus 2.0 Messages (between the System Firmware, Alert Sending Device, Remote Control Device, and Sensors)
 ACPI System Description Table (sometimes referred to as the "ASF!" table) to be populated by the System Firmware and used by the Alert Sending Device

See also 
 Alert on LAN (AoL)
 Desktop and mobile Architecture for System Hardware (DASH)
 Distributed Management Task Force (DMTF)
 Intel Active Management Technology (AMT)
 Intelligent Platform Management Interface (IPMI)
 Wake on LAN (WoL)

References

External links 
 

Communications protocols
DMTF standards
Out-of-band management
Remote control